The Islamic Association of North Texas (IANT) is a non-profit organization of Muslims dedicated to worship, education, and community service in Richardson, Texas. IANT provides many services to the North Texas community in the Dallas-Fort Worth Metroplex. In addition to religious services such as the five daily prayers, weekly Friday sermons, Taraweeh prayers, community Iftars, Eid prayers, marriage ceremonies, counseling services, and Dawah work, IANT also provides several other educational and community services.

IANT is also the mother-organization of the IANT Quranic Academy (IQA), Suffa Islamic Seminary (SIS), IANT Youth, and IANT Sports.

History 

IANT was established in February 1971 and was incorporated in the state of Texas as a non-profit, tax exempt, and religious organization. The initial founding group consisted of six Muslim families and some students, which rotated between each other's homes as Masjids. As the Muslim community in the Dallas area grew, it was decided to purchase three frame houses on Bagdad Road in Grand Prairie, Texas, which became the headquarters of IANT. However, the region proved inadequate because most newly arriving families preferred the Richardson/Garland area which was in a closer proximity to the city of Dallas and provided better school districts and the need for larger premises became a necessity.

In 1979, IANT purchased a large frame house with a barn on Abrams Road in Richardson. On October 30, 1982, a big ceremony took place and the fundraising for the new Mosque began. In 1983, the Restland Cemetery, which is in close proximity to IANT, was secured for Muslim burial needs. Eventually, in 1985, the city of Richardson granted a final occupancy permit. During that month and Inauguration Ceremony was held.

As the community grew larger, a surprise visitor stopped by the Masjid. The world-famous boxer Muhammad Ali joined for afternoon prayers and the socialized with everyone present. During the ensuing years, the community grew exponentially and forced the administration to embark a big expansion project with a larger prayer hall, better facilities for the ladies, a body preparation facility (which is used for funerals), a multi-purpose hall for conferences and other social activities such as exhibitions and games. A medical clinic with certified doctors was also established.

During this period of changes, the community around the association grew so large, that Dr. Yusuf Ziya Kavakci, a well known Turkish scholar who served as the Imam of the Masjid at that time, initiated the IQA Quranic Academy, with the goal of generating scholars of the future to serve the entire nation. Another project by Dr. Kavakci was the Suffa Islamic Seminary, where students could learn and share their Islamic heritage and culture.

After pursue of the youth of the community, the IANT Youth program was introduced in 2010, followed by the IANT sports program in 2012. These and many different projects and expansions have made the IANT the largest Muslim community in the state of Texas.

Services Offered
Prayers

 Five daily prayers
 Jumua (Friday) prayers
 Taraweeh and Eid prayers
 Janaza (Funeral) prayers

Education/Outreach

 Dawah
 Two Quranic School programs with daily and Sunday Schedules
 Speakers for churches, prisons, schools, universities, and other institutions
 Library facility in the masjid for Islamic research
 Outreach programs for new Muslims and non-Muslims

Other
 Distribution of Zakat and Fitra
 Library facility in the masjid for Islamic research
 Medical Clinic (for Muslims & non-Muslims)
 Family and marriage counseling services
 Multipurpose Hall for recreational and community purposes
 Ghusl (washing of the deceased) facility at the Masjid

See also
 List of mosques in the Americas
 Lists of mosques
 List of mosques in the United States

References

External links

Richardson, Texas
Mosques in Texas
1969 establishments in Texas